Manasa Veena may refer to:
 Maanasaveena, a 1976 Indian Malayalam-language film
 Manasa Veena (1984 film), an Indian Telugu-language film
 Manasa Veene, a 1987 Indian Kannada-language drama film